Zach Latimer (born October 21, 1983) is a former American football linebacker.  He played college football at the University of Oklahoma.  
His father, Don Latimer, played collegiate football for the University of Miami, and in the National Football League (NFL) for the Denver Broncos.

External links
Oklahoma Sooners bio

1983 births
Living people
Players of American football from Denver
American football linebackers
Oklahoma Sooners football players